Al-Kafrayn  is a Syrian village located in Douma District, Rif Dimashq, 23.1 kilometers (14.4 mi) southeast of Old Damascus. According to the Syria Central Bureau of Statistics (CBS), Al-Kafrayn had a population of 3,842 in the 2004 census. To its North and East is Harran al-Awamid, Jdeidet al-Khass to its south and Damascus Airport to its west.

References 

Populated places in Douma District